Kenneth "Red" Cochrane (March 31, 1908 – November 24, 1998) was an American football player, coach, and college athletics administrator.  He served as the head football coach at the University of Akron in Ohio from 1952 to 1953.  As athletic director at Akron in 1950, Cochrane shortened the school's athletic nickname from "Zippers" to "Zips".  Cochrane was born in Glasgow, Scotland.  He died on November 24, 1998 in Stuart, Florida at the age of 90.  He played college football at Akron from 1928 to 1930.

Head coaching record

References

1908 births
1998 deaths
American football halfbacks
Akron Zips athletic directors
Akron Zips football coaches
Akron Zips football players
University of Akron faculty
Sportspeople from Glasgow
Scottish emigrants to the United States